William Wood (29 June 1910 – 1958) was an English professional footballer who played in the Football League for Blackburn Rovers, Burnley and Mansfield Town.

References

1910 births
1958 deaths
English footballers
Association football wing halves
English Football League players
Blackburn Rovers F.C. players
Burnley F.C. players
Mansfield Town F.C. players
Chorley F.C. players
Darwen F.C. players